Ashok Kumar (born 8 April 1966) is an Indian field hockey player. He competed in the men's tournament at the 1988 Summer Olympics.

References

External links
 

1966 births
Living people
Indian male field hockey players
Olympic field hockey players of India
Field hockey players at the 1988 Summer Olympics
Field hockey players from Jalandhar